Ali ibn Yusuf (also known as "Ali Ben Youssef") (born 1084 died 26 January 1143) was the 5th Almoravid emir. He reigned from 1106 to 1143.

Biography 
Ali ibn Yusuf was born in 1084 in Ceuta. He was the son of Yusuf ibn Tashfin, the fourth Almoravid Emir, and Zaynab an-Nafzawiyyah was his mother. Sources confused Qamar, surnamed Faid al-Husn (beauty perfection) a Christian concubine, to be his mother. However, Qamar was his slave concubine and the mother of his son Syr.  At the time of his father's death, in September 1106, he was 23 years old. He succeeded his father on 2 September 1106. Ali ruled from Morocco and appointed his brother  as governor of Al-Andalus. Ali expanded his territories in the Iberian Peninsula by capturing the Taifa of Zaragoza in 1110 but eventually lost it again to Alfonso I, King of Aragon, in 1118. Córdoba rebelled against the Almoravids in 1121.

Patronage 

He commissioned a minbar now known as the Minbar of the Kutubiyya Mosque from a workshop in Córdoba to furnish his grand mosque, the original Ben Youssef Mosque (destroyed under the Almohads), in the imperial capital, Marrakesh. The Almoravid Qubba also bears Ali's name.

At the advice of Abu Walid Ibn Rushd (grandfather of Averroes), Ali built walls around Marrakesh as Ibn Tumart became more influential. There had been walls around the mosque and the palace, but Ali ibn Yūsuf spent 70,000 gold dinars on the city's fortifications, doubling the city's size, and told the amirs of Al-Andalus to fortify their walls as well.

He also established an irrigation system in Marrakesh, a project managed by Obeyd Allah ibn Younous al-Muhandes. This irrigation system made use of qanawat (p. ). Ali also had the first bridge over the Tensift River built.

In 1139, he lost the Battle of Ourique against the Portuguese forces led by the count Afonso Henriques, which allowed Afonso to proclaim himself an independent King.

Ali was succeeded by his son Tashfin ibn Ali in 1143.

Sargasso Sea 
According to the Muslim cartographer Muhammad al-Idrisi, the Mugharrarin (also translated as "the adventurers") sent by Ali ibn Yusuf, led by his admiral Ahmad ibn Umar, better known under the name of Raqsh al-Auzz reached a part of the ocean covered by seaweed, identified by some as the Sargasso Sea, which stretches into the Atlantic from Bermuda.

Family 
Ali was the son of Yusuf ibn Tashfin. He had at least two sons:
 Tashfin ibn Ali, governor of Granada and Almeria in 1129 and Cordoba in 1131. Succeeded his father in 1143.
 Ishaq ibn Ali. Died in 1147.

References 

1143 deaths
Almoravid emirs
Muslims of the 1113–1115 Balearic Islands expedition
People from Marrakesh
Year of birth unknown
1084 births